Agricultural Act, the name of several United States federal laws, may refer to:

Agricultural Act of 1949
Agricultural Act of 1954
Agricultural Act of 1956
Agricultural Act of 1958
Agricultural Act of 1961
Agricultural Act of 1964
Agricultural Act of 1970